is a subway station on the Toei Asakusa Line operated by the Tokyo Metropolitan Bureau of Transportation, and a railway station above ground level on the Chūō-Sōbu Line at the same site operated by the East Japan Railway Company (JR East). It is located in the Asakusabashi neighborhood of Taitō, Tokyo, Japan. Its number on the Asakusa Line is A-16.

Station layout

JR platforms

JR Asakusabashi Station has two side platforms with two tracks between them. Platform 1 is for passengers going toward  and Mitaka Stations. Platform 2 serves those bound for Kinshichō and Chiba Stations.

Toei platforms

Underground, the Asakusa Line station has an island platform between the two tracks. Trains on Platform 1 go toward  and Nishi-magome Stations, while those on Platform 2 depart for the terminal of the subway line at Oshiage Station; through trains continue onward from there.

History
Asakusabashi opened on July 1, 1932, as a station on the Sōbu Line. On December 4, 1960, the subway station on what was then known as Toei Line 1 began to operate.

On November 28, 1985, Asakusabashi Station was firebombed by masked members of the Revolutionary Communist League, National Committee, who claimed that this action, as well as other acts of sabotage committed across several prefectures the same day were to support the 24-hour strike by the labour union Doro-Chiba protesting against the impending privatisation of Japanese National Railways (JNR). This incident did not affect operations on the Toei Asakusa Line as the underground platforms were not targeted. 48 persons were arrested during an investigation.

Surrounding area
The station serves the  neighborhood. Nearby are the Lycée Franco-Japonais de Tokyo, the Kanda River, and the Sumida River. The former Yanagibashi geisha quarter was located to the south of the station.

See also
 List of railway stations in Japan

References
This article incorporates material from 浅草橋駅 (Asakusabashi-eki) in the Japanese Wikipedia, retrieved on December 15, 2007.

Railway stations in Japan opened in 1932
Railway stations in Tokyo
Toei Asakusa Line
Stations of East Japan Railway Company
Chūō-Sōbu Line